Joseph Haïm Sitruk (‎; 16 October 1944 – 25 September 2016) was a former Chief Rabbi of France, a position he held from June 1987 to 22 June 2008. Born Joseph Sitruk in Tunis, after suffering a stroke in 2001 and recovering he added the name "Haim" to his name in line with Jewish tradition.

Sitruk graduated as a rabbi in 1970 following his studies in a rabbinical school, and was named Rabbi of Strasbourg before becoming the assistant of the Chief Rabbi Max Warchawski.

In 1975, Sitruk became Chief Rabbi of Marseille. In 1987 he was elected to occupy the post of Chief Rabbi of France. He was then re-elected for two more seven-year terms. 

On 16 March 2007, Sitruk was selected as a Commander of the Legion of Honor.

Sitruk lost his bid for re-election as Chief Rabbi of France on 22 June 2008, against Rabbi Gilles Bernheim, who had previously run against him on the 1994 Chief Rabbinate elections and failed.

Sitruk was Orthodox. Though he may not have held religious and moral authority over all Jews in France, his charisma earned him a certain reverence, especially among Sephardi Jews. He was married and the father of 9 children. He was also the president of the Conference of European Rabbis.

Sitruk died on 25 September 2016 at the age of 71.

References 

1944 births
2016 deaths
Chief rabbis of France
French Orthodox rabbis
Sephardi rabbis
Tunisian emigrants to France
20th-century Tunisian rabbis
20th-century French rabbis
People from Tunis
French people of Tunisian-Jewish descent
Commandeurs of the Légion d'honneur
21st-century French rabbis